Petit Bois is a community in the Ouest department of Haiti. 

Petit Bois or Petit-Bois can also refer to:

 Petit Bois Island, island in Mississippi, United States
 Petit-Bois Stadium, a football stadium in the Champagne-Ardenne region of France
 Arboretum du Petit-Bois, an arboretum in the Lorraine region of France
 Château de Petit-Bois, a 19th-century mansion in the Auvergne region of France

See also
Grand Bois (disambiguation)